The Hebtiahs Bohra are a branch of Mustaali Ismaili Shi'a Islam that broke off from the mainstream Dawoodi Bohra after the death of the 39th Da'i al-Mutlaq in 1754. They are mostly concentrated in Ujjain in India with a few families who are Hebtiah Bohra.

History of the Imāmī-Hebtiahs Bohra 

{| class="" style="float:center; margin: 2ex 0 0.6em 0.5em; width: 8em; line-height:111%;" 
!The schematic history of the development of the Imāmī-Mustā‘līan Hebtiahs Bohra from other Shī‘ah Muslim sects
|-    
|

See also
Alavi Bohra
Atba-i-Malak
Atba-e-Malak Badar
Atba-i-Malak Vakil
Dawoodi Bohra
Progressive Dawoodi Bohra
Patani Bohras
Sulaymani Bohra
Sunni Bohra

References

Bohra
Tayyibi Isma'ili branches